Social Security Disability Insurance (SSD or SSDI) is a payroll tax-funded federal insurance program of the United States government. It is managed by the Social Security Administration and designed to provide monthly benefits to people who have a medically determinable disability (physical or mental) that restricts their ability to be employed. SSDI does not provide partial or temporary benefits but rather pays only full benefits and only pays benefits in cases in which the disability is "expected to last at least one year or result in death." Relative to disability programs in other countries in the Organisation for Economic Co-operation and Development (OECD), the SSDI program in the United States has strict requirements regarding eligibility.

People frequently confuse Social Security Disability Insurance (SSDI) and Supplemental Security Income (SSI). Unlike SSDI (as well as Social Security retirement benefits) where payment is based on contribution credits earned through previous work and therefore treated as an insurance benefit without reference to other income or assets, SSI is a means-tested program in the United States for disabled children, disabled adults, and the elderly who have income and resources below administratively mandated thresholds. A legitimately disabled person (a finding based on legal and medical justification) of any income level can receive SSDI. ('Disability' under SSDI is measured by a different standard than under the Americans with Disabilities Act.)

Informal names for SSDI include Disability Insurance Benefits (DIB) and Title II disability benefits. These names come from the chapter title of the governing section of the Social Security Act. The original Social Security Act of August 1935 did not include SSDI. Rather, SSDI was put into effect in July 1956 after two decades of policy debates.

Beneficiaries

Number and Trends
At the end of 2020, there were 9.7 million Americans receiving benefits from the SSDI program. This included 8.2 million disabled workers, 1.4 million children of disabled workers, and 0.1 million spouses of disabled workers. Children and spouses are sometimes referred to as auxiliary beneficiaries because they receive benefits based on their relationship to a disabled worker, not because they are necessarily disabled.

The number of beneficiaries grew rapidly between 1990 and 2010 before leveling off and then declining in recent years. Two schools of thought developed to explain the rapid growth in the program during the 1990s and early 2000s.  According to David Autor and Mark Duggan, policy changes and earnings patterns were responsible for the growth. With regard to policy, Autor and Duggan argue an SSDI reform act loosened the disability screening process, leading to  more SSDI awards and shifting their composition towards claimants with low-mortality disorders such as mental illness and back pain. With regard to earnings patterns, Autor and Duggan argue SSDI benefits rose in value relative to what recipients would have earned from employment, prompting greater numbers of individuals to seek benefits. The second school of thought on program growth in the 1990s and early 2000s emphasized demographic factors such as population growth, aging of the baby boom generation into their disability-prone years, growth in women's labor force participation, and the increase in Social Security's full retirement age from 65 to 66.

The number of disabled workers peaked in 2014 at 9.0 million and has declined in each year since, reaching 8.2 million individuals in 2020.

The rapid program growth in the 1990s and early 2000s prompted concerns that the Disability Insurance (DI) Trust Fund would be depleted in 2015. In response, Congress temporarily reallocated some payroll taxes dedicated to the Old-Age and Survivors Insurance (OASI) Trust Fund to the DI Trust Fund. Most recent analysis indicates that the DI Trust Fund is not projected to become depleted until 2057. - sooner than the projected depletion year of 2065 found in the 2020 report.

In addition to disabled workers, the Social Security program also pays benefits to disabled widow(er)s and disabled adult children. These beneficiaries are often analyzed along with disabled workers because the same definition of disability is used in the eligibility process. However, disabled widow(er) benefits are paid out of the Old-Age and Survivors Insurance (OASI) Trust Fund and disabled adult children may be paid out of the OASI or DI Trust Fund depending on whether the adult child qualifies because a parent is deceased or retired or whether a parent is disabled. In 2019, there were 1.14 million disabled adult children and 0.25 million disabled widow(er)s receiving benefits.

Characteristics

Social Security disability beneficiaries have high poverty rates relative to other Social Security beneficiaries. About 24 percent of disabled workers have family income below the official poverty level in the United States compared to only 7.1 percent of retired workers (the largest group of Social Security beneficiaries). About 31 percent of disabled widow(er) beneficiaries and 36 percent of disabled adult children are poor. In total, 2.4 million disabled worker, widow(er), and adult child beneficiaries are poor.  In addition, about 38 percent of Social Security disability beneficiaries experience material hardship, defined as having low or very low food security or an inability to pay utility bills or housing costs.

About 72 percent of Social Security disabled workers are between the ages of 50 and 66 and about 28 percent are under the age 50 (at Social Security's "full retirement age" (currently age 66), the Social Security Administration reclassifies disabled workers as retired workers). Twenty-four percent of disabled workers are African American.

As expected from a program that is restricted to persons with severe disabilities, Social Security disability beneficiaries, relative to the general working age population in the United States, have very high rates of health problems and very high rates of hospitalization and medical visits.

The work capacity of Social Security disability beneficiaries has been the subject of several studies and policy debates. Some have argued, despite their impairments, many disabled beneficiaries could return to work whereas others have argued the work capacity of Social Security disability beneficiaries is very limited due to the wide distribution of severe health problems among the population.

Monthly benefit amounts 
In 2019, the average monthly benefit amount paid to disabled workers was about $1,260. Approximately 36 percent of disabled workers received a monthly benefit that was under $1,000.

The monthly benefit amount a disabled worker receives depends on the person's earnings in Social Security covered employment prior to becoming disabled. For each disabled worker, a Primary Insurance Amount (PIA) is computed that depends on the worker's past earnings, wage growth in the economy prior to the worker's disability onset, and a benefit formula that gives greater relative weight to low earners. The disabled worker receives a benefit equal to 100 percent of the PIA. An eligible spouse or child can receive 50 percent of the PIA as a benefit amount but total payments to a family are subject to a maximum.

Monthly benefits in the Social Security program have three general features. They replace a larger share of past earnings for low earners  and they are increased with price inflation once a person is on the benefit rolls. Initial benefits are computed using wage indexing, which allows for initial benefits to reflect wage growth in the economy that occurred during the worker's career.

Monthly benefit amounts for disabled adult children depend on the earnings in Social Security covered employment of the retired, disabled, or deceased parent and amounts for disabled widow(er)s depend on the earnings of the deceased spouse.

Application, Initial Determination, and Appeals

Application
An application must be filed with the Social Security Administration (SSA) before an individual can receive SSDI. Individuals can apply for SSDI by:

 Calling SSA's national toll-free number (1-800-772-1213) or
 Contacting a local Social Security office or
 Submitting an online application 

SSA will determine whether the applicant is "insured" for Social Security disability benefits. Generally, this depends on whether the applicant has worked "long enough – and recently enough - and paid Social Security taxes" on earnings. With regard to disabled widow(er) or disabled adult child Social Security benefits, however, the applicant does not have to be insured based on the individual's own employment history. Rather, in those cases, the deceased spouse or the parent of the disabled adult child must have worked in Social Security employment and achieved the required insured status.

SSA will also determine whether the individual is performing substantial gainful activity, which means earning above certain levels. If the individual is performing substantial gainful activity, then the application for disability is denied.

If the applicant is found to be insured for Social Security benefits and not performing substantial gainful activity, SSA will send the application to the Disability Determination Service (DDS) agency in the applicant's state. The state DDS, which is under contract with SSA, will make a determination of whether the individual is disabled or not. The state DDS must follow federal rules regarding the definition of disability under the Social Security Act when making this determination.

Initial Determination
The decision about disability is based on a sequential evaluation of medical and other evidence. The sequence for adults is:
1. Is the applicant performing substantial gainful activity? If yes, deny. If no, continue to next sequence.
2. Is the applicant's impairment severe? If no, deny. If yes, continue to next sequence.
3. Does the impairment meet or equal the severity of impairments in the Listing of Impairments? If yes, allow the claim. If no, continue to next sequence.
4. Is the applicant able to perform past work? If yes, deny. If no continue to next sequence.
5. Is the applicant able to perform any work in the economy? If yes, deny. If no allow the claim.

Medical evidence that demonstrates the applicant's inability to work is required. The DDS may require the applicant to visit a third-party physician for medical documentation, often to supplement the evidence treating sources do not supply. The applicant may meet a SSA medical listing for their condition (step 3 of the sequential evaluation) and be awarded benefits. If their condition does not meet the requirements of a listing, their residual functional capacity (RFC) is considered, along with their age, past relevant work, and education, in determining their ability to perform either their past work, or other work generally available in the national economy. The RFC is an assessment of an individual's work capacity given their impairments.

Determination of RFC—made in step 4 of the sequential evaluation process—often constitutes the bulk of the SSDI application and appeal process. An RFC is assessed in accordance with Title 20 of the Code of Federal Regulations, part 404, section 1545 and is generally based upon the opinions of treating and examining physicians, if available.

RFC is classified according to the five exertional levels of work defined in the Dictionary of Occupational Titles, which are: Sedentary, Light, Medium, Heavy, and Very Heavy. For example, an individual's RFC may indicate, at most, the individual can perform medium work, given the individual's impairments. If the RFC of an individual equals or exceeds the job requirements of the individual's previous work, the claim is denied on the basis that the individual can return to former work. If the individual's RFC is less than the requirements of former work then the RFC is applied against a vocational grid that considers the individual's age, education and transferability of formerly learned and used skills. The vocational grid then guides whether an allowance or denial of benefits should occur.

Appeals
In fiscal year 2020, state DDSs denied 61 percent of initial claims. SSA provides for three levels of administrative appeal if an applicant is initially denied by a state DDS. At the first level, the applicant may request a reconsideration of the initial decision. In the reconsideration, a different DDS examiner will review the case. If the claim is denied at this stage, the applicant can request a hearing before an Administrative Law Judge (ALJ). ALJs are not state employees but rather federal employees of the Social Security Administration. If the claim is denied at this stage, the applicant can request a review of the case by the Appeals Council of the Social Security Administration. Administrative appeals are non-adversarial and new evidence can be submitted by the applicant.

After an applicant has exhausted the administrative appeals process, the individual may appeal the case to the federal courts. Federal court findings may pertain to the individual case, but may also result in required changes in SSA's policies and procedures if the court concludes those policies and procedures do not conform to federal law or the U.S. Constitution.

Legal representation 
Applicants may hire a lawyer or non-attorney representative to help them apply or appeal. There are two primary types of organizations: companies with trained specialists experienced in handling SSDI applications and appeals in some or any local community across the country and law firms which specialize in disability-related cases.

Most SSDI applicants—about 90 percent according to the SSA—have a disability representative for their appeal. An August 2010 report by the Office of Inspector General for the Social Security Administration indicated that many people submitting an initial disability application for SSDI might benefit from using a third-party disability representative when they first apply for benefits. It indicated that having a disability representative earlier in the process significantly improves the chances of those with four major types of disabilities getting approved for SSDI.

The fee that a representative can charge for SSDI representation is set by law and is limited to 25 percent of the retroactive SSDI benefits awarded.  While some representatives may charge fees for costs related to the claim, such as photocopy and medical record collection expenses, the vast majority of disability attorneys and representatives do not charge a fee unless they win the case. Prior to 1991, social security administration regulations required attorneys and representatives to submit a "Fee Petition" itemizing time spent on the matter. The SSDI applicant had the opportunity to agree or object to the fee requested, and the social security decision-maker often approved less than the full fee amount requested by the attorney/representative.

In 1991 the social security administration implemented the "Fee Agreement" process.  If the attorney/representative contract limited the fee to no more than $4000, a detailed review and approval of time spent on the case via the "Fee Petition" process was no longer required.  Social security regulations require that the fee agreement conform to specific standards. This attorney fee cap for the "Fee Agreement" process was increased to $6000 effective June 22, 2009.  Because of the reduced administrative burden afforded by the "fee Agreement" process, and the time delay for approving and disbursing fees under the "Fee Petition" process, the majority of disability lawyers and representative primarily use the "Fee Agreement" process.
  
If an SSDI applicant is approved quickly and does not receive a retroactive award, the SSA must review and approve the fee a representative will charge the individual. Disability representatives do not charge a fee if they are unsuccessful in obtaining a claimant's disability benefit.

Representatives may decline to represent you if, after reviewing your situation, they do not believe you are likely to meet the requirements for SSDI. Most representatives will provide this screening at no cost to you. Typical reasons individuals do not meet the requirements are: their disability is not severe enough or the applicant does not have a sufficient work history (and did not pay enough into FICA - the Federal Insurance Contributions Act).

Wait time for decisions and hearings
The amount of time it takes for an application to be approved or denied varies, depending on whether it is an initial decision or a decision based on an appeal.  In fiscal year 2019, it took an average of 120 days for SSA to make an initial determination on a disability claim. The figure increased following the COVID-19 pandemic and, for months in fiscal year 2021, the average wait time for an initial decision is 165 days.

The high number of cases and long wait times for a hearing before an Administrative Law Judge has drawn significant attention from Congress in recent years. Congress provided additional funding for this workload and the number of cases and wait times have declined. In fiscal year 2020, the average wait time for a hearing was 386 days (down from 605 days in fiscal year 2017).

For some cases, SSA will expedite disability determinations. These include Quick Disability Determination (QDD) and Compassionate Allowance cases. These are cases where statistical models or medical diagnoses indicate the person has an extremely severe medical condition. These cases can often be processed in under 30 days. Additionally, many cases involving military veterans are expedited.

Congressional concern over wait times has focused, to some extent, on the number of individuals who die or become bankrupt while waiting for a disability determination. The Government Accountability Office (GAO) found that from fiscal year 2014 through fiscal year 2019, about 48,000 individuals filed for bankruptcy while awaiting a final decision on their disability appeal and, for fiscal year 2008 through fiscal year 2019, about 110,000 individuals died prior to receiving a final decision regarding their appeal.

Likelihood of receiving benefits
Considering all levels of adjudication, about 4 in 10 SSDI applicants are awarded benefits. Slightly more than 50 percent of applicants who meet technical requirements of eligibility are determined to be medically eligible.

The number of cases and percentage allowed at each stage of adjudication for all types of disability cases in fiscal year 2020 are as follows:

Denied Applicants
One study found that 12.4 million Americans or about 6.2 percent of the U.S. population ages 18–66 are denied SSDI applicants. The study also found these individuals had high rates of health problems and a high rate of hospitalization compared to the general population. About 52 percent of denied applicants reported difficulty standing for one hour compared to about 5 percent for the general population. About 21 percent of denied applicants were hospitalized during the year compared to about 6 percent for the general population. Denied applicants had a high poverty rate (38 percent) and a high rate of material hardship (43 percent). Material hardship was measured as having low or very low food security or an inability to pay utility or housing costs.

A baseline study of denied SSDI and SSI applicants who sought benefits on the basis of mental impairments found denied applicants had low-income and had "multiple mental health and general medical conditions, low quality of life, and low functional ability." The baseline population is composed of individuals who are part of the Social Security Administration's Supported Employment Demonstration. The goal of the demonstration is to test whether employment support and health interventions can improve outcomes for denied applicants.

Payee assignment
Generally, the person qualifying for benefits is determined to be capable of managing their own financial affairs, and the benefits are disbursed directly to them. In the case of persons who have a diagnosed mental impairment which interferes with their ability to manage their own finances, the Social Security Administration may require that the person assign someone to be their representative payee. This person will receive the benefits on behalf of the disabled individual, and disburse them directly to payers such as landlords, or to the disabled person, while providing money management assistance (help with purchasing items, limiting spending money, etc.). The representative payee often does not charge a fee for this service, especially if it is a friend or relative. Social service agencies who are assigned as payee are not prohibited from charging a fee, although the maximum fee is set by Social Security. The fee is the same for ALL recipients, except it can be larger for those with severe substance abuse problems (Social Security determines when a higher fee can be charged, not the representative payee.) Some states and counties have representative payee agencies (also called substitute payee programs) which receive the benefits on behalf of the disabled person's social worker, and disburse the benefits per the social worker's instructions. A payee can be very helpful in the instance of homeless individuals who need assistance paying down debts (like utility bills) and saving for housing.

About 10 percent of disabled worker beneficiaries have representative payees and about 5 percent of disabled widow(er)s have representative payees. The figure is much higher for disabled adult children, with about 73 percent of these Social Security beneficiaries having representative payees.

Regulatory changes
The "treating physician rule" gave "controlling weight" to determinations of the treating physicians. The rule was established in 1991 by the Social Security Administration (SSA) under the influence of federal courts and a law passed by Congress after the SSA was scrutinized in the 1980s for controversially relying largely on its own medical examiners. Prior to the codified rule, federal courts had imposed a similar rule through a common law, but it was inconsistent.

On January 18, 2017, the Social Security Administration published final rules titled "Revisions to Rules Regarding the Evaluation of Medical Evidence" regarding the "treating physician rule". These new rules regarding the assessment of medical opinions in a SSDI case apply to cases filed after March 27, 2017. While these new rules expand the definition of what SSA considers to be an "acceptable medical source" for disability claim medical opinions to include nurse practitioners, physician assistants, and others, they also have effectively abolished the "treating physician rule" by eliminating the requirement that a treating physician opinion be granted "controlling weight".

A regulation implemented by SSA in 2020 removed the inability to speak English as an educational factor to be considered in SSI and Social Security disability determination. The regulation is projected to "result in a reduction of about 6,500 OASDI [Social Security] beneficiary awards per year and 4,000 SSI recipient awards per year on average over the period FY 2019–28, with a corresponding reduction of $4.6 billion in OASDI benefit payments and $0.8 billion in Federal SSI payments over the same period." SSA argued communicating in English is no longer "a reliable indicator of an individual's educational attainment or the vocational impact of an individual's education." Disability advocates, however, questioned the validity of this argument and provided comments arguing against the regulation.

Related programs

Regardless of a person's age, after receiving SSDI benefits for 24 months, they are eligible for Medicare, including Part A (hospital benefits), Part B (medical benefits), and Part D (drug benefits). The date of Medicare eligibility is measured from the date of eligibility for SSDI (generally 6 months after the start of disability), not the date when the first SSDI payment was received.

Individuals receiving SSDI may qualify for Supplemental Security Income if they have limited income and resources. For example, a disabled individual who worked in Social Security covered employment and who has limited income and resources may receive a Social Security disability benefit (due to employment prior to disability) and a partial SSI benefit (due to limited income and resources). The Social Security Administration, which administers both SSDI and SSI, uses the same definition of disability for adults in each program.

The Department of Veterans Affairs (VA) uses a different definition of disability than the Social Security program, but individuals may qualify for benefits under each program depending on the severity of the disability. While the Social Security Administration does not use VA disability ratings per se, it will examine VA medical records as part of the applicant's medical information. In addition, individuals who are rated 100 percent disabled by the VA will receive fast-track review of their cases by SSA if they apply for SSDI.

The Ticket to Work program is administered by SSA and provides free employment support services to SSDI recipients seeking to return to the workforce.

While not part of SSDI, some individuals hold disability insurance coverage obtained through an employer or through the private insurance markets. Five states (California, New York, New Jersey, Rhode Island, and Hawaii) operate programs that provide temporary disability benefits.

Impact
According to a 2021 study, which used variation induced by an age-based eligibility rule as a way to draw causal inferences, SSDI substantially reduced the financial distress of disabled individuals. The study finds that SSDI "reduces the likelihood of bankruptcy by 20 percent, foreclosure by 33 percent, and home sale by 15 percent."

References

Further reading
Social Security Disability Starter Kit
B.E.S.T The Benefit Eligibility Screening Tool
Social Security and the "D" in OASDI: The History of a Federal Program Insuring Earners Against Disability

External links
 Disability Programs; Social Security Administration
 Press release on new Social Security Disability determination process
 2011 Red Book "A Summary Guide To Employment Support For Persons With Disabilities Under The Social Security Disability Insurance and Supplemental Security Income Programs"
 Social Security Administration Listing of Impairments
 Social Security Disability Research & Information 
 SSDI Research Guide 

Social security in the United States
Disability law in the United States
Federal assistance in the United States